William Paget may refer to:

William Paget, 1st Baron Paget (1506–1563), English statesman
William Paget, 4th Baron Paget de Beaudesert (1572–1629), English colonist
William Paget, 5th Baron Paget (1609–1678), English peer
William Paget, 6th Baron Paget (1637–1713), English peer and ambassador
William Paget (MP) (1769–1794), MP for Anglesey, 1790–1794
Lord William Paget (1803–1873), British naval commander and politician
William Paget (actor), 18th-century English actor and author